The Minister's Wooing is a historical novel by Harriet Beecher Stowe, first published in 1859. Set in 18th-century New England, the novel explores New England history, highlights the issue of slavery, and critiques the Calvinist theology in which Stowe was raised.  Due to similarities in setting, comparisons are often drawn between this work and Nathaniel Hawthorne's The Scarlet Letter (1850).  However, in contrast to Hawthorne's The Scarlett Letter, The Minister's Wooing is a "sentimental romance"; its central plot revolves around courtship and marriage.  Moreover, Stowe's exploration of the regional history of New England deals primarily with the domestic sphere, the New England response to slavery, and the psychological impact of the Calvinist doctrines of predestination and disinterested benevolence.

With its intense focus upon the history, customs, and mannerisms of New England, The Minister's Wooing is one sense an example of the local color writing that proliferated in late 19th century.  However, because Stowe also highlighted the issue of slavery, this time in the North, this novel is related to her earlier anti-slavery novels.  Finally, the work serves as a critique of Calvinism, written from the perspective of an individual deeply familiar with the theological system. 

Stowe's father was well-known Calvinist minister Lyman Beecher. Stowe drew elements of the novel from events in both her and her older sister Catharine Beecher's lives.   Throughout the novel, Stowe portrays the reaction of different personality types to the pressures of Calvinist principles, illustrating in this manner what she perceives as Calvinism's strengths and weaknesses.  In particular, responding to the untimely death of her sister's fiancé and the deaths of two of her own children, Stowe addresses the issue of predestination. This suggested that individuals were either saved or damned at birth, and only the elect would go to heaven.

Publication history
The Minister's Wooing was first serialized in the Atlantic Monthly, from December 1858 to December 1859. It was published in book form first in England by Sampson Low, Son & Co., in order to guarantee British royalties, and then in the US by Derby and Jackson.

The novel was the subject of a 1909 United States Supreme Court copyright case, Mifflin v. Dutton. The court ruled that the novel's authorized publication in Atlantic Monthly, without the required copyright notices, was a dedication to the public domain.

Genesis of the novel
In 1857, Harriet Stowe's son Henry drowned in the Connecticut River.  Like the sailor James in the novel, he was unregenerate at the time of his death.  Stowe had first begun to reassess the Calvinist view of salvation after watching her sister Catherine wrestle in 1822 with the similar loss of an unregenerate fiancé. Henry's death spurred further reflection.  The grief and doubt which both Harriet and her sister had dealt with inspired the novel. Their experiences are expressed in the character of Mrs. Marvyn.

Some readers, including Stowe's grandson Lyman Beecher Stowe, proclaimed the book to be an assault on Calvinism.  Stowe questioned the establishment in which she had been raised, but her journals do not suggest that she intended an attack against this system. She expressed a profound respect and admiration for both Calvinist theology and the individuals who grappled with its doctrines.  Her stated intent instead was to point out certain flaws and to spread tolerance.

Synopsis
The story is set in Newport, Rhode Island, when it was still a prosperous fishing and shipping town and not a fashionable retreat for the rich. Dr. Hopkins is a 40-year-old minister. Mary is the daughter of his hostess in town, and Hopkins soon falls in love with Mary. She, however, is still in love with James Marvyn, a sailor presumed lost at sea.  

Mary is very religious and, after a period of mourning, she decides to marry Dr. Hopkins.  Mary has other suitors, including Aaron Burr, but she sees that even though he is the grandson of Jonathan Edwards and has been raised in Calvinism, he is mired in evil. James returns from the sea before the marriage and Dr. Hopkins knows that he cannot compete with Mary's love for the sailor. Hopkins calls off the marriage. Mary and James are free to marry and live happily.

Major characters

Minister Samuel Hopkins
He is an apostle of Jonathan Edwards's "New Divinity."  He struggles to maintain his spiritual independence and assert his spiritual authority against the wealthy members of his congregation, who observe church rules rather than living truly Christian lives.  He is named for and based on the historical Samuel Hopkins, minister at the First Congregational Church of Newport in the late 18th century. But events of the story are fictional.

Mary Scudder
This fictional character is partly based on the author's older sister, Catharine Beecher.  Mary loved a sailor who has been lost in a shipwreck and is presumed dead.  She is a typical Stowe heroine, resigned to her sorrow and bearing her grief as atonement for her sins and those of her lost seaman.

James Marvyn
Mary's lost sailor. Both Mary and his mother agonize over his fate and his salvation.  He was not a Christian and therefore, according to traditional Calvinist theology, irrevocably damned.  He eventually returns to Mary. Having survived the shipwreck, his virtue is shown by his having become a Christian and achieved wealth.

Mrs. Marvyn 
James's mother.  She is angry with a God who seemed to have destined the death of her unsaved son.  Her despair is lifted with the help of Mary and Candace, a free black woman who works as her servant. They convince her that God is love.

Minor characters

Candace
Mary Scudder's free black servant. Candace's displays of  integrity and love toward Mrs. Marvyn speak very highly of her character.  Mary treats Candace more as a friend and confidant than a servant.

Virginie de Frontenac
She is the wife of a French diplomat and she falls in love with Aaron Burr.  Mary helps Virginie save her marriage. In return, Virginie helps bring Mary and James together.  Virginie is a Roman Catholic and serves as a figure of the religious tolerance that Stowe had begun to embrace by this time in her life.

Aaron Burr
Based on the real-life Vice President of the United States, Burr is a grandson of Jonathan Edwards. Stowe uses him as an example of some of the ill effects of being raised in Calvinistic fanaticism.  Burr attempts to woo Mary as well as Virginie.  Mary confronts him with his attempted adultery (pp. 362–63), and he withdraws.  But this does not stop him from his "brilliant and unscrupulous political intrigues" and ultimate, total disgrace (p. 428).  "Chased from society, pointed at everywhere by the finger of hatred, so accursed in common esteem…  one seems to see in a doom so much above that of other men the power of an avenging Nemesis for sins beyond those of ordinary humanity."  (p. 428, Hurst & Co. ed.)

Miss Prissy Diamond
The town dressmaker and busy body.  Although James returns to town, Mary believes she has an obligation to marry Minister Hopkins.  Miss Prissy tells the minister about Mary's true love. Hopkins calls off the wedding, so that Mary and James are free to marry.

External links
 .
  An early review of the book.

Footnotes

References and further reading
 .
 .
 .
 .
 .
 .
 .
 .
 .

Novels about American slavery
1859 American novels
American historical novels
Novels first published in serial form
Novels by Harriet Beecher Stowe
Works originally published in The Atlantic (magazine)
Novels about slavery
Novels set in New England
Novels set in the 18th century